Phrictopyga is a genus of delphacid planthoppers in the family Delphacidae. There are about 12 described species in Phrictopyga.

Species
These 12 species belong to the genus Phrictopyga:

 Phrictopyga contorta (Muir, 1926)
 Phrictopyga curvistilus (Muir, 1926)
 Phrictopyga escadensis (Muir, 1926)
 Phrictopyga fuscovittata (Muir, 1926)
 Phrictopyga graminicola (Muir, 1926)
 Phrictopyga holmgreni (Muir, 1930)
 Phrictopyga nugax Fennah, 1959
 Phrictopyga occidentalis (Muir, 1926)
 Phrictopyga parvula (Osborn, 1926)
 Phrictopyga semele Fennah, 1959
 Phrictopyga urbana (Muir, 1926)
 Phrictopyga vittata (Muir, 1926)

References

Further reading

 
 
 
 
 

Delphacinae
Auchenorrhyncha genera
Articles created by Qbugbot